Reckless Romance is a 1924 American silent comedy film directed by Scott Sidney and starring T. Roy Barnes, Harry Myers, and Wanda Hawley.

Plot
As described in a review in a film magazine, Jerry Warner (Barnes) and Edith Somers (Breamer) are in love but Judge Somers (Marshall) will not allow them to marry because Jerry shows no signs of being a business man. Jerry’s uncle sends him ten thousand dollars to set him up in business and Judge Somers tells him if he has that money at the end of six months he can marry Edith. Jerry invests half of it in oil stock which Judge Somers says is worthless. Chris (Myers) and Beatrice Skinner (Hawley), just married, receive word from Chris’ grandfather that he will stop the allowance because he does not like the girl. They decide to get a divorce and remarry after Chris has Grandpa’s money. For ten thousand dollars Jerry poses as the co-respondent and they frame a scene for Grandpa to see. But their plans go awry. Chester becomes jealous and says he will get a real divorce and Edith catches them in a compromising position. It all turns out all right with Grandpa approving of Beatrice, Jerry explaining to Beatrice, and the oil stock proving to be valuable.

Cast

Preservation
A complete copy of Reckless Romance is located at the Eye Filmmuseum in Amsterdam.

References

Bibliography
 Darby, William. Masters of Lens and Light: A Checklist of Major Cinematographers and Their Feature Films. Scarecrow Press, 1991.

External links

1924 films
1924 comedy films
1920s English-language films
American silent feature films
Silent American comedy films
American black-and-white films
Films directed by Scott Sidney
Producers Distributing Corporation films
1920s American films